The Women's 500 m time trial at the 2014 Commonwealth Games, was part of the cycling programme, which took place on 24 July 2014. The winner Anna Meares, retained her title from the 2010 Women's 500 m time trial event.

Results

References

Women's 500 m time trial
Cycling at the Commonwealth Games – Women's 500 m time trial
Comm